This is the full list of "official" Power Lap times on the Top Gear test track.

Qualifying vehicles
Top Gear define a qualifying vehicle as a road-legal production car on road-legal tires that has sufficient ride height to clear a standard speed bump. For these reasons the F1 car (Renault R24) (0:59.0), Aston Martin DBR9 (1:08.6) and Sea Harrier (0:31.2) do not appear.  Whenever a non-qualifying vehicle is raced, the time is compared to the official power laps but then removed from the board. For example, the Ferrari FXX owned by Michael Schumacher (1:10.7) was taken off the board because it both failed to meet road legal standards and used slick tyres, and the Caparo T1 (1:10.6) was removed because its front wing was too low to drive over a Speed bump.

{| class="sortable wikitable"
! Time !! Vehicle !! Episode
|-
| 01:11.3 || Ferrari SF90 Stradale || Series 29, Episode 01
|-
| 01:12.7 || Ferrari 488 Pista || Series 27, Episode 01
|-
| 01:12.8 || Dallara Stradale || Series 27, Episode 03
|-
| 01:13.4 || Porsche 991 GT2 RS || Series 26, Episode 03
|-
| 01:13.7 || McLaren 675LT || Series 23, Episode 02
|-
| 01:13.8 || Pagani Huayra || Series 19, Episode 01
|-
| 01:14.3 || BAC Mono || Series 20, Episode 02 
|-
| 01:15.1 || Ariel Atom V8 500 (moist) || Series 16, Episode 01
|-
| 01:15.1 || Dodge Viper ACR || Series 23, Episode 01
|-
| 01:15.1 || McLaren 600LT || Series 27, Episode 01
|-
| 01:15.7 || Audi R8 V10 Plus || Series 23, Episode 03
|-
| 01:15.8 || Lamborghini Huracán LP610-4 || Series 22, Episode 01
|-
| 01:16.0 || Mercedes-AMG GT R (partly damp) || Series 24, Episode 06
|-
| 01:16.0 || Ariel Atom 4 || 
|-
| 01:16.1 || Porsche 991 GT3 RS || Series 24, Episode 06
|-
| 01:16.2 || McLaren MP4-12C || Series 17, Episode 03
|-
| 01:16.5 || Lamborghini Aventador LP700-4 || Series 17, Episode 06
|-
| 01:16.6 || Maserati MC20 || Series 32, Episode 04
|-
| 01:16.8 || Bugatti Veyron Super Sport || Series 15, Episode 05
|-
| 01:17.1 || Gumpert Apollo S || Series 11, Episode 06
|-
| 01:17.3 || Ascari A10 || Series 10, Episode 09
|-
| 01:17.5 || Mercedes-AMG GTS || Series 22, Episode 04
|-
| 01:17.6 || Koenigsegg CCX (with Top Gear Wing) || Series 08, Episode 04
|-
| 01:17.6 || Honda NSX (second generation) || Series 23, Episode 06
|-
| 01:17.6 || Porsche Taycan Turbo S || Series 28, Episode 03
|-
| 01:17.7 || Noble M600 (cold) || Series 14, Episode 05
|-
| 01:17.8 || Nissan GT-R (2012) || Series 17, Episode 04
|-
| 01:17.8 || Pagani Zonda Roadster F (Clubsport Version) || Series 12, Episode 04
|-
| 01:17.9 || Caterham Seven Superlight R500 (cold) || Series 12, Episode 06
|-
| 01:18.3 || Bugatti Veyron 16.4 || Series 12, Episode 04
|-
| 01:18.4 || Pagani Zonda F || Series 07, Episode 04
|-
| 01:18.9 || Maserati MC12 || Series 06, Episode 02
|-
| 01:19.0 || Lamborghini Murciélago LP670-4 SuperVeloce || Series 13, Episode 02
|-
| 01:19.0 || Mercedes-Benz SLS AMG Black Series || Series 20, Episode 04
|-
| 01:19.0 || Ferrari Enzo || Series 05, Episode 02
|-
| 01:19.1 || Ferrari 458 Italia || Series 15, Episode 06
|-
| 01:19.5 || Lamborghini Gallardo LP560-4 || Series 12, Episode 01
|-
| 01:19.5 || Porsche 997 GT2 || Series 12, Episode 01
|-
| 01:19.5 || Ariel Atom 2 300 || Series 05, Episode 09
|-
| 01:19.6 || Mercedes-Benz SLS AMG Roadster || Series 18, Episode 02
|-
| 01:19.7 || Aston Martin V8 Vantage || Series 26, Episode 05
|- 
| 01:19.7 || Mercedes AMG E63 S || Series 26, Episode 02
|-
| 01:19.7 || Nissan GT-R || Series 11, Episode 05
|-
| 01:19.7 || Ferrari 430 Scuderia || Series 11, Episode 01
|-
| 01:19.8 || BMW M5 (F90) || Series 26, Episode 02
|-
| 01:19.8 || Chevrolet Corvette C7 Stingray (written as Corvette S'ray) || Series 22, Episode 05
|-
| 01:19.8 || Ferrari 599 GTO || Series 16, Episode 02
|-
| 01:19.8 || Lamborghini Murciélago LP640 || Series 09, Episode 05
|-
| 01:19.8 || Porsche Carrera GT || Series 04, Episode 04
|-
| 01:20.4 || Chevrolet Corvette C6 ZR1 (damp) || Series 14, Episode 02
|-
| 01:20.4 || Koenigsegg CCX (without Top Gear Wing) || Series 08, Episode 01
|-
| 01:20.7 || Ascari KZ1 (damp) || Series 07, Episode 01
|-
| 01:20.8 || Lamborghini Gallardo LP 570-4 Superleggera || 
|-
| 01:20.9 || Mercedes-Benz SLR McLaren || Series 04, Episode 02
|-
| 01:21.0 || Mercedes-Benz C63 AMG Black Series || Series 18, Episode 05
|-
| 01:21.0 || Porsche 911 GT3 RS || 
|-
| 01:21.2 || Porsche Cayenne Turbo GT || 
|-
| 01:21.22 || Ferrari 599 GTB Fiorano || Series 10, Episode 03
|-
| 01:21.4 || Alfa Romeo Giulia Quadrifoglio || Series 24, Episode 02
|-
| 01:21.5 || Aston Martin DB11 || Series 24, Episode 03
|-
| 01:21.5 || Tesla Model 3 AWD Performance || Series 27, Episode 02
|-
| 01:21.6 || Porsche Cayman GTS || Series 22, Episode 05
|-
| 01:21.6 || BMW F80 M3 || Series 24, Episode 02
|-
| 01:21.6 || Porsche 718 Cayman S || Series 24, Episode 07
|-
| 01:21.6 || Jaguar F-Type R Coupé || Series 22, Episode 07
|-
| 01:21.6 || Mercedes-Benz SLS AMG || 
|-
| 01:21.6 || Audi R8 V10 (damp) || Series 14, Episode 02
|-
|-
| 01:21.7 || Chevrolet Corvette C8 Stingray (damp) || Series 31, Episode 03
|-
| 01:21.7 || Mercedes-Benz SLS AMG Electric Drive || Series 20, Episode 04
|-
| 01:21.7 || Lamborghini Urus || Series 29, Episode 03
|-
| 01:21.9 || Ford GT || Series 04, Episode 08
|-
| 01:21.9 || Audi RS 6 Avant || Series 29, Episode 03
|-
| 01:22.2 || Porsche 997 Turbo Cabriolet || Series 15, Episode 04
|-
| 01:22.3 || Caterham Seven 620R (wet) || Series 21, Episode 04
|-
| 01:22.3 || Audi R8 V10 Spyder || Series 15, Episode 04
|-
| 01:22.3 || Ferrari 360 Challenge Stradale || Series 04, Episode 03
|-
| 01:22.3 || Porsche 996 GT3 RS || Series 04, Episode 03
|-
| 01:22.3 || Alpine A110S || 
|-
| 01:22.4 || Chevrolet Corvette C6 Z06 || Series 08, Episode 02
|-
| 01:22.5 || Audi RS Q8 || 
|-
| 01:22.5 || Noble M15 || Series 08, Episode 08
|-
| 01:22.6 || Mercedes-Benz C63 AMG S || Series 27, Episode 02
|-
| 01:22.7 || BMW M2 || Series 23, Episode 05
|-
| 01:22.8 || Lexus LFA (wet) || Series 14, Episode 07
|-
| 01:22.9 || Ferrari F430 F1 || Series 06, Episode 08
|-
| 01:22.9 || Porsche 911 Sport Classic || Series 15, Episode 02
|-
| 01:22.9 || Alpine A110|| Series 25, Episode 06
|-
| 01:23.0 || Mercedes-Benz SL65 AMG Black Series || Series 13, Episode 03
|-
| 01:23.1 || Porsche 911 GT3 || 
|-
| 01:23.1 || Maserati Gran Turismo MC Stradale || Series 18, Episode 05
|-
| 01:23.1 || KTM X-Bow R || 
|-
| 01:23.1 || Toyota Supra MKV || Series 27, Episode 05
|-
| 01:23.2 || Ferrari F430 Spider F1 || Series 06, Episode 08
|-
| 01:23.3 || Jaguar XKR-S || Series 17, Episode 04
|-
| 01:23.5 || Porsche 718 Cayman GTS (damp) || 
|-
| 01:23.7 || Lamborghini Murciélago ||  Series 03, Episode 04
|-
| 01:23.8 || Pagani Zonda C12 S 7.3 (partly damp) || Series 01, Episode 01
|-
| 01:23.9 || Aston Martin DBS || Series 10, Episode 07
|-
| 01:23.9 || Koenigsegg CC8S  || Series 02, Episode 07
|-
| 01:24.0 || Ariel Atom || Series 02, Episode 06
|-
| 01:24.0 || Mercedes AMG S63 || Series 24, Episode 03
|-
| 01:24.2 || Veritas RS III || Series 12, Episode 06
|-
| 01:24.3 || Prodrive P2 (concept) || Series 08, Episode 05
|-
| 01:24.4 || Audi R8 (damp) || Series 10, Episode 02
|-
| 01:24.4 || Aston Martin Virage || Series 17, Episode 02
|-
| 01:24.6 || TVR Sagaris || Series 06, Episode 07
|-
| 01:24.8 || Alfa Romeo 4C || Series 21, Episode 02
|-
| 01:24.8 || Mitsubishi Lancer Evolution VIII MR FQ-400 (damp)|| Series 05, Episode 07
|-
| 01:24.8 || TVR Tuscan Mk.II || Series 06, Episode 03
|-
| 01:24.9 || Audi TT RS (damp) || 
|-
| 01:24.9 || Bentley Continental GT Supersports || Series 15, Episode 01
|-
| 01:24.9 || Porsche Boxster Spyder || Series 15, Episode 02
|-
| 01:24.9 || Mercedes-Benz E63 AMG || Series 15, Episode 03
|-
| 01:25.0 || Noble M12 GTO-3 || Series 02, Episode 10
|-
| 01:25.0 || BMW 1 Series M Coupe (damp) || Series 17, Episode 01
|-
| 01:25.0 || Caterham R400 || Series 02, Episode 06
|-
| 01:25.1 || BMW M135i || Series 21, Episode 05
|-
| 01:25.1 || Lotus Exige S || Series 08, Episode 03
|-
| 01:25.1 || Zenos E10 S (Mildly moist / Damp) || Series 23, Episode 05
|-
| 01:25.3 || Ariel Atom 4 (wet) || Series 28, Episode 01
|-
| 01:25.3 || Porsche Panamera Turbo || Series 15, Episode 03
|-
| 01:25.3 || BMW M3 (E90 Saloon) || Series 12, Episode 05
|-
| 01:25.6 || Honda Civic Type R (FK8) || Series 25, Episode 03
|-
| 01:25.6 || Lexus LC500 || Series 25, Episode 03
|-
| 01:25.7 || Lotus Evora (written as Lotus Dress Shop) || Series 13, Episode 01
|-
| 01:25.7 || Audi RS4 || Series 07, Episode 02
|-
| 01:25.7 || Lamborghini Gallardo Spyder || Series 08, Episode 07
|-
| 01:25.8 || Lamborghini Gallardo (wet) || Series 03, Episode 04
|-
| 01:25.9 || Morgan Aero 8 GTN || Series 05, Episode 05
|-
| 01:26.0 || Mercedes-Benz CLK 63 AMG Black series || Series 11, Episode 02
|-
| 01:26.0 || BMW Z4 M Roadster (E85) || Series 08, Episode 04
|-
| 01:26.0 || Noble M400 (Shown on Top Gear Revved Up DVD) || 
|-
| 01:26.0 || Mitsubishi Lancer Evolution VIII MR FQ320 || Series 04, Episode 04
|-
| 01:26.2 || BMW M5 (E60) || Series 06, Episode 09
|-
| 01:26.2 || Porsche 911 Carrera S (997) (damp) (written as Porsche Rubbish) || Series 10, Episode 02
|-
| 01:26.2 || BMW M8 Competition (wet) || Series 28, Episode 06
|-
| 01:26.2 || Brabus S Biturbo Roadster || Series 09, Episode 04
|-
| 01:26.3 || Vauxhall VXR8 Bathurst S || Series 13, Episode 07
|-
| 01:26.3 || Toyota GR Yaris || 
|-
| 01:26.4 || Ford Focus RS Mk III || Extra Gear
|-
| 01:26.4 || TVR Tuscan 2S || 
|-
| 01:26.4 || Lotus Exige (mildly moist) || Series 04, Episode 01
|-
| 01:26.5 || BMW M3 E92 Competition Pack (moist) || Series 16, Episode 05
|-
| 01:26.5 || BMW M3 (E92) || Series 10, Episode 10
|-
| 01:26.7 || Porsche Cayman S || Series 07, Episode 02
|-
| 01:26.7 || Jaguar XFR (written as Jaaaaag XFR) || Series 13, Episode 05
|-
| 01:26.8 || Chevrolet Corvette C6 LS2 || Series 04, Episode 10
|-
| 01:26.8 || Aston Martin V12 Vantage (Not Shown on TV) || Series 13, Episode 07
|-
| 01:26.8 || Ferrari 575M Maranello GTC || Series 05, Episode 04
|-
| 01:26.8 || Volkswagen Golf GTI Clubsport Mk8 || 
|-
| 01:26.9 || Lexus IS-F || Series 12, Episode 05
|-
| 01:26.9 || Mercedes-Benz CLS55 AMG || Series 06, Episode 01
|-
| 01:27.0 || Renault Mégane Sport || Series 26, Episode 03
|-
| 01:27.0 || KTM X-Bow (Driven by new Stig) || Series 18, Episode 06
|-
| 01:27.0 || BMW M5 E39 || Series 01, Episode 08
|-
| 01:27.1 || Aston Martin Vanquish S || Series 05, Episode 04
|-
| 01:27.1 || Aston Martin DB9 || Series 04, Episode 01
|-
| 01:27.1 || HSV Maloo || Series 13, Episode 07
|-
| 01:27.2 || Porsche 996 GT3 (very wet) || Series 03, Episode 01
|-
| 01:27.2 || Tesla Roadster (mildly moist) || Series 12, Episode 07
|-
| 01:27.3 || Spyker C8 Spyder (with hard top) || Series 04, Episode 07
|-
| 01:27.4 || Aston Martin DBS (wet) || Series 10, Episode 07
|-
| 01:27.4 || Cupra Leon Estate  || 
|-
| 01:27.5 || Audi RS5 (moist) || Series 16, Episode 05
|-
| 01:27.5 || Nissan 370Z GT || Series 13, Episode 06
|-
| 01:27.5 || TVR T350C || Series 02, Episode 10
|-
| 01:27.5 || Eagle Low Drag GT || Series 22, Episode 07
|-
| 01:27.7 || Cosworth Impreza STI CS400 (wet) (written as Subaru Cossie) || Series 16, Episode 03
|-
| 01:27.7 || Honda Civic Type R (FK2) || Series 23, Episode 03
|-
| 01:27.7 || Renault Mégane RenaultSport Cup 265 || Series 19, Episode 04
|-
| 01:27.9 || Wiesmann MF 3 || Series 06, Episode 03
|-
| 01:27.9 || Chevrolet Camaro SS || Series 15, Episode 03
|-
| 01:28.0 || Ford Mustang GT || Series 23, Episode 06
|-
| 01:28.0 || Roush Mustang || Series 09, Episode 06
|-
| 01:28.0 || BMW M3 CSL (E46) (wet) || Series 03, Episode 02
|-
| 01:28.0 || TVR T350C || Series 01, Episode 10
|-
| 01:28.1 || Renault Mégane R26.R || Series 13, Episode 04
|-
| 01:28.2 || BMW Z4 sDrive35i (E89) || Series 13, Episode 06
|-
| 01:28.2 || BMW X5 M (E70) (wet) || Series 14, Episode 04
|-
| 01:28.2 || Marcos TSO GT2 || Series 07, Episode 05
|-
| 01:28.2 || Lotus Elise Sport 190 || Series 02, Episode 06
|-
| 01:28.2 || Subaru Impreza WRX STI || Series 11, Episode 02
|-
| 01:28.22 || Mitsubishi Lancer Evolution X FQ-300 || Series 11, Episode 02
|-
| 01:28.3 || Vauxhall Astra VXR || Series 19, Episode 04
|-
| 01:28.5 || Dodge Viper SRT-10 (very wet) || Series 05, Episode 03
|-
| 01:28.5 || BMW 645Ci || Series 04, Episode 05
|-
| 01:28.6 || Volkswagen Golf GTI Mk7 (with performance pack) || Series 21, Episode 05
|-
| 01:28.6 || MG XPower SV || Series 03, Episode 07
|-
| 01:28.7 || Porsche Boxster S || Series 05, Episode 07
|-
| 01:28.9 || BMW 330i (self-driving car with Jeremy Clarkson as the passenger) || Series 10, Episode 08
|-
| 01:28.9 || Mitsubishi Lancer Evolution VIII MR FQ-300 || Series 02, Episode 06
|-
| 01:28.9 || Porsche 997 Carrera S (very wet) || Series 05, Episode 01
|-
| 01:29.0 || Mercedes-Benz CL65 AMG || Series 04, Episode 09
|-
| 01:29.0 || Lamborghini Murciélago (partly damp) || Series 01, Episode 01
|-
| 01:29.0 || Alpina Z8 Roadster || Series 02, Episode 03
|-
| 01:29.2 || BMW M5 (F10) (Very Wet) || Series 18, Episode 07
|-
| 01:29.3 || Ford Focus RS Mk II || Series 13, Episode 04
|-
| 01:29.4 || Subaru Impreza WRX STI WR1 || Series 04, Episode 04
|-
| 01:29.4 || Range Rover Sport || Series 20, Episode 06
|-
| 01:29.6 || Volkswagen Golf GTI W12-650 Concept || Series 10, Episode 01
|-
| 01:29.6 || Ford Focus ST || Series 19, Episode 04
|-
| 01:29.6 || Volkswagen Golf GTI Mk VII (Sport Mode) || Series 20, Episode 03
|-
| 01:29.9 || Zenvo ST1 (very wet) || Series 21, Episode 03
|-
| 01:30.0 || Ford Shelby GT500 || Series 09, Episode 06
|-
| 01:30.0 || Autodelta Alfa Romeo 147 GTA 3.7 || Series 04, Episode 02
|-
| 01:30.1 || Subaru Impreza WRX STi || Series 02, Episode 06
|-
| 01:30.1 || Vauxhall Monaro VXR || Series 06, Episode 11
|-
| 01:30.3 || Alfa Romeo Giulietta Quadrifoglio Verde || Series 24, Episode 02
|-
| 01:30.4 || Maserati MC20 (very wet) || Series 32, Episode 04
|-
| 01:30.4 || Aston Martin DB7 GT (with full tank of fuel) || Series 02, Episode 04
|-
| 01:30.4 || Volkswagen Golf R32 mk.V || Series 07, Episode 06
|-
| 01:30.8 || Ariel Nomad || Series 23, Episode 01
|-
| 01:30.8 || Ford Focus RS 500 (wet) || Series 16, Episode 03
|-
| 01:30.9 || Audi S4 quattro 4.2 || Series 02, Episode 02
|-
| 01:31.0 || Vauxhall Corsa VXR Nurburgring (partly snowy) || Series 18, Episode 03
|-
| 01:31.0 || Porsche 996 Turbo (wet) || Series 02, Episode 05
|-
| 01:31.2 || BMW 760Li (wet) || Series 14, Episode 01
|-
| 01:31.3 || Vauxhall VX220 Turbo || Series 02, Episode 06
|-
| 01:31.3 || Vauxhall VXR8 (wet) || Series 10, Episode 08
|-
| 01:31.3 || Toyota GT86 (partly wet) || Series 19, Episode 03
|-
| 01:31.4 || Audi TT Mk.II 2.0T || Series 09, Episode 02
|-
| 01:31.6 || Honda NSX Type-R  (wet) || Series 03, Episode 09
|-
| 01:31.8 || BMW M3 E46 || Series 02, Episode 02
|-
| 01:31.8 || BMW 535d (E60) || Series 06, Episode 10
|-
| 01:31.8 || Nissan 350Z || Series 03, Episode 05
|-
| 01:31.8 || Mazda RX-8 || Series 03, Episode 05
|-
| 01:31.9 || BMW 130i (E87) || Series 07, Episode 06
|-
| 01:31.9 || Lotus Esprit V8 (cold tyres)|| Series 01, Episode 10
|-
| 01:32.0 || Peugeot RC (wet) || Series 01, Episode 07
|-
| 01:32.0 || Mazda RX-8 || Series 09, Episode 02
|-
| 01:32.0 || Renaultsport Clio 200 || Series 20, Episode 01
|-
| 01:32.0 || Mazda MX-5 || Series 22, Episode 07
|-
| 01:32.1 ||Mercedes-Benz S63 AMG (wet) || Series 14, Episode 01
|-
| 01:32.2 ||Ford Focus RS Mk I || Series 01, Episode 02
|-
| 01:32.2 ||Mazda 6 MPS|| Series 08, Episode 06
|-
| 01:32.3 ||Renaultsport Mégane 225 Cup|| Series 06, Episode 09
|-
| 01:32.3 ||Skoda Octavia VRS Estate Mk IV|| 
|-
| 01:32.5 ||Lotus Esprit V8 (cold tyres) || Series 01, Episode 10
|-
| 01:32.6 || Volkswagen Golf GTI Mk VI || 
|-
| 01:32.7 || Ford Fiesta ST || Series 20, Episode 01
|-
| 01:32.7 ||Audi TT 3.2 quattro || Series 03, Episode 08
|-
| 01:32.8 ||Honda Civic Type-R (2004 Facelift)|| Series 05, Episode 06
|-
| 01:32.8 ||Jaguar E-Type (modernised) || Series 06, Episode 05
|-
| 01:32.9 ||Noble M12 GTO (wet)|| Series 01, Episode 02
|-
| 01:32.9 ||SEAT León Cupra R|| Series 05, Episode 06
|-
| 01:32.9 ||Mercedes-Benz SLK350|| Series 05, Episode 07
|-
| 01:33.0 ||Audi RS6 (very wet) || Series 01, Episode 08
|-
| 01:33.0 ||Vauxhall Astra VXR|| Series 06, Episode 09
|-
| 01:33.1 ||Noble M12 GTO (wet) || Series 01, Episode 02
|-
| 01:33.2 ||Mercedes-Benz SL55 AMG (owned by Jeremy Clarkson at the time) (very wet) || Series 01, Episode 06
|-
| 01:33.2 || Peugeot 208 GTi || Series 20, Episode 01
|-
| 01:33.3 || Audi Q7 V12 (wet) || Series 14, Episode 04
|-
| 01:33.3 || Toyota Supra Mk4 || 
|-
| 01:33.3 || Volkswagen Golf Mk.IV R32 || Series 01, Episode 09
|-
| 01:33.4 || Cadillac CTS-V First Generation (very wet) || Series 06, Episode 04
|-
| 01:33.5 || Honda Civic Type-R (FN2-2007) || Series 10, Episode 06
|-
| 01:33.7 || MG ZT 260 || Series 04, Episode 05
|-
| 01:33.7 || Volkswagen Golf Mk.V GTI || Series 05, Episode 06
|-
| 01:33.7 || Honda NSX-R (very wet) || Series 01, Episode 06
|-
| 01:33.8 || Clio Renault Sport 182 || Series 04, Episode 06
|-
| 01:33.9 || Holden Monaro (written as Loser) (wet) || Series 03, Episode 06
|-
| 01:34.0 || Renault Mégane 225 || Series 05, Episode 06
|-
| 01:34.0 || MG ZR || Series 01, Episode 08
|-
| 01:34.0 || Renault Clio 200 Cup (Not Shown on TV) || Series 17, Episode 02
|-
| 01:34.2 || MINI Cooper S Works || Series 05, Episode 06
|-
| 01:34.4 || Modified Volkswagen Golf GTI MKII || 
|-
| 01:34.5 || Ford Mondeo ST220 || Series 08, Episode 06
|-
| 01:34.6 || Hyundai i30N (very wet) || Series 25, Episode 04
|-
| 01:34.7 || Jaguar XKR (melted snow) || Series 09, Episode 01
|-
| 01:34.9 || Ford Focus ST (written as Asbo ST) (foggy) || Series 07, Episode 03
|-
| 01:35.0 || Nissan 300ZX || Series 13, Episode 05
|-
| 01:35.0 || Volvo S60 R || Series 02, Episode 09
|-
| 01:35.2 || Ferrari 575M Maranello (very wet) || Series 01, Episode 04
|-
| 01:35.3 || Ferrari 208 GTB Turbo (Not Shown on TV) || 
|-
| 01:35.3 || Vauxhall Vectra VXR || Series 08, Episode 06
|-
| 01:35.4 || Renault Avantime (tuned by presenters) (written as Our Car) || Series 12, Episode 03
|-
| 01:35.5 || Fiat 500 Abarth Essesse SS || Series 12, Episode 02
|-
| 01:35.5 || Mercedes-Benz E55 AMG (very wet) || Series 01, Episode 08
|-
| 01:35.6 || Alfa Romeo 147 GTA || Series 02, Episode 08
|-
| 01:35.6 || Lotus Elise (wet) || Series 01, Episode 07
|-
| 01:35.8 || Citroën C4 VTS || Series 05, Episode 06
|-
| 01:35.9 || BMW 325i (E93) (wet) || Series 16, Episode 04
|-
| 01:36.2 || Aston Martin Vanquish (very wet) || Series 01, Episode 04
|-
| 01:36.2 || Renault Clio V6 Sport (very wet, spin before finishline) || Series 02, Episode 05
|-
| 01:36.5 || Ford F-150 Hennessey VelociRaptor (wet) || Series 22, Episode 06
|-
| 01:36.5 || Honda Civic Type R || Series 01, Episode 02
|-
| 01:36.9 || Alfa Romeo Brera 2.2 || Series 09, Episode 02
|-
| 01:37.0 || Mercedes-Benz SL500 (Ronnie O'Sullivan's) || Series 04, Episode 04
|-
| 01:37.0 || Porsche Boxster (very wet) || Series 03, Episode 02
|-
| 01:37.3 || BMW Z4 3.0i (very wet) (E85) || Series 03, Episode 02
|-
| 01:37.4 || Honda S2000 (very wet) || Series 03, Episode 02
|-
| 01:37.5 || Honda e || 
|-
| 01:37.8 || Eagle Low Drag GT (very wet)|| Series 22, Episode 07
|-
| 01:37.9 || Saab 9-5 Aero || Series 03, Episode 03
|-
| 01:38.0 || Maserati 4200 GT (very wet) || Series 01, Episode 08
|-
| 01:38.06 || Honda Civic Type-R (EP3) || Series 01, Episode 02
|-
| 01:38.2 || Alfa Romeo 8C Competizione (very wet) || Series 11, Episode 04
|-
| 01:39.0 || Subaru Impreza WRX (Europe-spec) || Series 01, Episode 02
|-
| 01:39.3 || Volkswagen Golf GTI Mk7 (very wet) || Series 25, Episode 04
|-
| 01:39.4 || Bowler Wildcat || Series 02, Episode 01
|-
| 01:39.6 || Fiat New 500 || 
|-
| 01:39.7 || Dacia Sandero || Series 26, Episode 04
|-
| 01:40.4 || Morgan 3 Wheeler (written as Morgan Tricycle) || Series 18, Episode 06
|-
| 01:40.8 || Bentley Arnage T (wet) || Series 01, Episode 05
|-
| 01:41.0 || Ford Mondeo 2.0i || Series 01, Episode 04
|-
| 01:42.4 || Bentley Mulsanne Speed (very wet) || Extra Gear
|-
| 01:42.5 || Renault Avantime || Series 12, Episode 03
|-
| 01:43.0 || Mercedes-Benz C-Class (W203) || Series 01, Episode 04
|-
| 01:43.2 || BMW 318i (E46) || Series 01, Episode 04
|-
| 01:44.0 || Overfinch 580 S (very wet) || Series 02, Episode 10
|-
| 01:44.0 || Honda Accord || Series 01, Episode 04
|-
| 01:44.4 || Suzuki Liana || Series 08, Episode 02
|-
| 01:45.0 || Renault Laguna || Series 01, Episode 04
|-
| 01:45.0 || Toyota Avensis || Series 01, Episode 04
|-
| 01:45.2 || Kia Ceed (melted snow) || Series 19, Episode 04
|-
| 01:45.5 || Caterham 7 160 (wet) || Series 21, Episode 04
|-
| 01:46.0 || Aston Martin DB5 || Series 06, Episode 05
|-
| 01:46.0 || Jaguar X-Type || Series 01, Episode 04
|-
| 01:46.0 || Suzuki Liana (Driven by Black Stig) || Series 01, Episode 01
|-
| 01:46.9 || Skoda Fabia VRS || Series 04, Episode 08
|-
| 01:47.0 || Porsche 911 Turbo (very wet) || Series 02, Episode 10
|-
| 01:48.2 || Hawk HF3000 (wet) (Kit car with Alfa Romeo V6 engine – spun twice during timed lap) || Series 14, Episode 03
|-
| 01:48.3 || Mini Cooper || Series 04, Episode 08
|-
| 01:49.1 || Smart Fortwo Brabus (very wet) || Series 24, Episode 04
|-
| 01:49.2 || Renault Twingo GT (very wet) || Series 24, Episode 04
|-
| 01:49.4 || Volkswagen Up! TSI (very wet) || Series 24, Episode 04
|-
| 01:50.3 || Bentley Meteor 'Spitfire engine in a car' || Series 18, Episode 06
|-
| 02:02.0 || Ford Transit World Rally || Series 01, Episode 08
|-
| 02:02.5 || Brutus|| Series 18, Episode 06
|-
| 02:44.1 || Einride || 
|-
| 18:37.0 || Porsche Pain Au Chocolat (foot pedalled by Richard Hammond) || Series 15, Episode 05
|-
| unknown || Jamie Oliver's VW Campervan (with Jamie cooking in) || Series 02, Episode 02
|-
| DNF || Jaguar XKR-R (spun during the timed lap) || Series 02, Episode 04
|-
| DNF || Lamborghini LM002 (ran out of petrol) || Series 03, Episode 04
|-
| DNF || Porsche 959 (broke down during lap) || Series 16, Episode 06
|-
| DNF || Reliant Robin (rolled on the first corner) || Series 15, Episode 02
|-
| DNS || Ferrari F40 (car did not start; broke down at the start line) || Series 16, Episode 06|}

Non-qualifying vehicles

Tested, but subsequently removed from board
 0:31.2 – BAE Sea Harrier (Piloted by Lieutenant Nick Arkle RN. Raced against the Saab 9-5 Aero. Took off then flew around track, ended in the air) – Series 3, Episode 3
 0:59.0 – Renault R24 Formula One car (Wet) – Series 5, Episode 8
 1:03.1 – Volkswagen I.D. R – N/A
 1:03.8 – Lotus T125 single seater – Series 17, Episode 6
 1:07.2 – McLaren 720S GT3X – N/A
 1:08.1 – Ferrari FXX-K – Series 24, Episode 1
 1:08.5 – Pagani Zonda R – Series 16, Episode 4
 1:08.6 – Aston Martin DBR9 – Series 6, Episode 6
 1:10.6 – Caparo T1 – Series 10, Episode 5
 1:10.7 – Ferrari FXX (Driven by Michael Schumacher on slick tyres) – Series 13, Episode 1
 1:13.2 – McLaren MP4-12C GT3 (driven by Stig) on slick tyres – N/A
 1:14.0 – Lamborghini Sesto Elemento – Series 20, Episode 5
 1:14.3 – McLaren 570S GT4 – Driven by Bono Huis – N/A
 1:15.2 – Aston Martin Vulcan (Damp) – Series 23, Episode 4
 1:1?.? – CAP 232 Aerobatic Plane (Piloted by British Aerobatic Champion, Tom Cassells. Raced against the Radical SR3 and was shown crossing the finish line in front, however the time was not shown.) – Series 1, Episode 9
 1:19.1 – Radical SR3 – Series 01, Episode 09
 1:19.8 – Radical SR3 – Series 02, Episode 06
 1:22.6 – Westfield XTR2 – Series 01, Episode 03
 1:23.4 – Ford GT40 – Series 05, Episode 08
 1:27.5 – Audi Quattro A2 B2 (Typ 85Q) – Series 05, Episode 08
 1:28.7 – Audi TT MTM Bimoto (cold tyres) – Series 01, Episode 10
 1:29.4 – AS One – Series 01, Episode 10
 1:30.0 – James Bond's Aston Martin DB5 – Series 30, Episode 02
 1:35.2 – Ford Escort RS1600 – Series 05, Episode 08

Driven to establish times in challenges
 1:35.9 – 2010 BMW 325i (E93) (Driven as modern-day equivalent to set target time for the late '80s BMW 325i (E30)s in the '4-seat convertibles for under £2,000' challenge.) (wet, top open)
 1:42.0 – Rover 416 GTI (Hammond's car in the '£100 car' challenge.)
 1:43.0 – Porsche 944 (May's car in the '£1500 Porsche' Challenge.)
 1:44.0 – Porsche 924 (Hammond's car in '£1500 Porsche' Challenge, time not stated, but they did say it was slower than May's 944. Hammond's score on the board stated he scored -9 points in the challenge, meaning he finished 9 seconds over the target time of 1:35.0.)
 1:45.0 – Porsche 928 (Clarkson's car in '£1500 Porsche' Challenge.)
 1:46.0 – Audi 80 1.8E (May's car in '£100 car' challenge.)
 1:48.0 – Volvo 760 GLE V6 (Clarkson's car in '£100 car' challenge.)
 1:48.0 – Vauxhall Astra Diesel Police car (Driven as modern-day equivalent to set target time in 'Budget Police Car' challenge.)
 1:48.0 – 1988 BMW 325i (E30) convertible (Clarkson's car in '4-seat convertibles for under £2,000' challenge, automatic and paving slab in boot. Driven by Clarkson. The engine was severely damaged by the run.)
 1:55.3 – 1987 BMW 325i (E30) convertible (Hammond's car in '4-seat convertibles for under £2,000' challenge, lowered suspension. Driven by Hammond.)
 1:55.4 – 1989 BMW 325i (E30) convertible (May's car in '4-seat convertibles for under £2,000' challenge, standard specification. Driven by May.)
 2:03.0 – Lexus LS400 (May's police car in 'Budget Police Car' Challenge, driven by May.)
 2:08.0 – Fiat Coupé 2.0 20v Turbo (Clarkson's police car in 'Budget Police Car' Challenge, driven by Clarkson.)
 2:15.82 – Volkswagen Tiguan whilst Towing a Caravan (Caravanner's Challenge)
 2:17.0 – Chevy G20 V8 Van (Hammond's ambulance in 'Ambulance Challenge', driven by the Stig. Track was fitted with 3 speed bumps, which the Chevy was able to clear at speed.).
 2:24.0 – Porsche 944 Turbo (Clarkson's ambulance in 'Ambulance Challenge' driven by the Stig. The speed bumps mentioned above slowed down the low-slung Porsche greatly.).
 2:57.0 – JCB Fastrac 8250 (Clarkson's tractor in the 'Tractor' Challenge.)
 3:14.0 – Suzuki Vitara 1.6 JLX (Hammond's police car in 'Budget Police Car' Challenge, driven by Hammond. Hammond left the track to drive through piled cardboard boxes, and increase his "style points". Car broke down after crossing line.)
 3:28.4 – Fendt 930 Vario (May's tractor in the 'Tractor' Challenge.)
 4:49.0 – Case STX Steiger (Hammond's tractor in the 'Tractor' Challenge.)
 12:28.0 – Ford Scorpio Cardinal (May's ambulance in 'Ambulance Challenge' driven by the Stig, includes time for raising and mending powered tailgate).
 DNF – Mazda CX-5 whilst towing a caravan (Caravanner's Challenge, Caravan Fell onto its side on the second to last corner, lifting rear wheels of car in the air)

Unofficial laps

Independently reported lap times, not in connection with Top Gear series:
 1:05.3 – Nissan ZEOD RC hybrid mode (internal combustion engine and electric motors).
 1:12.6 – McLaren 720S - Series 25
 1:12.8 – Ultima GTR. After Top Gear allegedly refused to drive it because "they thought it couldn't clear a speed bump", Ultima Sports, Ltd. drove the car from Surrey to the track and set the time, verified by Plans Motorsport.
 1:13.2 – McLaren P1 tested by Motor Trend 2014
 1:13.6 – Nissan ZEOD RC pure-electric vehicle mode.
 1:14.2 – Ferrari LaFerrari. Set on 12 June 2015 in damp conditions by Jason Plato as part of television programme TFI Friday's twentieth-anniversary show
 1:32.0 – Fiat Multipla - Set in 2019 by Stig (according to the video) driving the modified and engine-tuned Fiat Multipla "Multipla AMG" (151.8 hp - 336Nm - 1236 kg) from Vilebrequin's YouTube Channel (French).

Time adjustments
Sometimes an additional term is written next to the time (such as Hot). This indicates that The Stig and the Top Gear team consider that the prevalent weather conditions have affected the lap time or car's performance. The time on the board is not changed: e.g. 1:50 MM (Mildly Moist) is deemed to be equivalent to 1:48 on a normal dry track. The following list describes how many seconds it costs a car or gives a car an advantage. These adjustments are also not applicable to Formula 1 drivers.

References and notes

List of Top Gear test track Power Lap Times
[[Category:Road te 
Tst tracks]]